There is a quota of 40 athletes (24 male, 16 female) (however one spot over quota for each gender was allowed); Mexico as the host country is guaranteed a full team of four athletes (two men and two women). Qualification is done on a country basis, not an individual basis.

Qualification summary

Men

* Each country affiliated with PAMPC can send one athlete if they met the qualifying standard of 4800 points.

** The remaining spots were distributed to nations in the order of their second-placed athlete (must have met the standard of 4800 points).

Women

* Each country affiliated with PAMPC can send one athlete if they met the qualifying standard of 4200 points.

** The remaining spots were distributed to nations in the order of their second-placed athletes (must have met the standard of 4200 points).

References

External links
2010 Pan American Men's results
2010 Pan American Women's results

Qualification for the 2011 Pan American Games
Modern pentathlon at the 2011 Pan American Games